Jeong-eun, also spelled Jung-eun, Jeong-un, or Jong-un, is a Korean unisex given name. In South Korea, it is overwhelmingly used as a female name. Its meaning differs based on the hanja used to write each syllable of the name. , regulations of South Korea's Supreme Court list 84 hanja with the reading  and 30 hanja with the reading  which may be registered for use in given names. The Seoul-based Korean Broadcasting System (KBS) reported, based on a document obtained by North Korean defector and KBS employee Park Jin-hee, that beginning in January 2011 North Korea banned birth registrations using the name Kim Jong-un and required existing bearers of the name to change to a different name. The authenticity of the document could not be confirmed.

People with this name include:

Entertainers
Hong Jung-eun (born 1974), South Korean television screenwriter, one of the Hong sisters
Kim Jung-eun (born 1976), South Korean actress
Kim Ji-woo (born Kim Jeong-eun, 1983), South Korean actress
Im Jung-eun (born 1981), South Korean actress
Jo Jung-eun (born 1996), South Korean actress
Heo Jung-eun (born 2007), South Korean actress

Sportspeople
Jeong Jeong-eun (born 1945), South Korean female volleyball player
Park Jung-eun (born 1977), South Korean female basketball player
Kim Jung-eun (basketball) (born 1987), South Korean female basketball player
Ha Jung-eun (born 1987), South Korean female badminton player
Lee Jung-eun (sport shooter) (born 1987), South Korean female sport shooter
Lee Jeong-eun (golfer, born 1988), South Korean female golfer
Lee Jung-eun (judoka) (born 1988), South Korean female judo practitioner
Seo Jung-eun (born 1991), South Korean female field hockey player
Lee Jeong-eun (racewalker) (born 1994), South Korean female racewalker
Lee Jeong-eun (golfer, born 1996), South Korean female golfer, 2019 U.S. Women's Open champion

Other
Meredith Jung-En Woo (born 1958), South Korean-born American female political science professor
Hwang Jung-eun (born 1976), South Korean female writer and podcaster
Kim Jong-un (born 1983 or 1984), North Korean leader, son of Kim Jong-il

See also
List of Korean given names

References

Korean unisex given names